Joseph Baldarotta is an American retired ice hockey player and coach who was the NCAA Division III coach of the year.

Career
Baldarotta played two seasons for Wisconsin–Stevens Point in the mid-70's, ending his playing days in 1976. After college, he returned to his high school alma mater, Madison West, as an assistant coach for the hockey team and later became head coach. He returned to Stevens Point as an assistant in 1986 and helped head coach Mark Mazzoleni turn the pointers into a national powerhouse. WSP won three consecutive national titles and after the last, in 1991, Mazzoleni accepted an offer to coach at the Division I level. Baldarotta was promoted to head coach and kept the Pointers in good standing for several years. In his second year leading the program, Wisconsin–Stevens Point won its fourth national title and he received the Edward Jeremiah Award as the national Division III coach of the year.

After a decline in the mid-90s Baldarotta was able to bring the team back to prominence in 1998 and reached the championship game. Afterwards, however, the Pointers slowly sank down the NCHA standings. While Baldarotta was able to keep the team's head above water, Stevens Point never made another national appearance under his stewardship. He remained with the program until posting his worst season in 2007. After just his second losing season in 16 years, Baldarotta resigned as head coach.

Before the next season began, however, Baldarotta was back behind the bench, this time for Cortland State. The Red Dragons were hoping to rise out of the duldrums under Baldarotta and the results looked promising in his first year. Cortland posted its best record in 6 years and fell one win shy of reaching .500. Unfortunately, the next five years saw disappointing records and the Red Dragons finished at or near the bottom of the SUNYAC standings each season. In 2013, Baldarotta retired as a coach and turned the team over to the team's former coach, Tom Cranfield.

Baldarotta was inducted into the Wisconsin Hockey Hall of Fame in 2015.

Statistics

Regular season and playoffs

Head coaching record

References

External links

Year of birth missing (living people)
American ice hockey coaches
American men's ice hockey forwards
Living people
Ice hockey people from Wisconsin
People from Madison, Wisconsin
Wisconsin–Stevens Point Pointers men's ice hockey players